Paul Thomas Anderson (born June 26, 1970), also known by his initials PTA, is an American filmmaker. His films have consistently garnered critical acclaim. Anderson's films are often psychological dramas and characterized by depictions of flawed and desperate characters, explorations of themes such as dysfunctional families, alienation, loneliness and redemption, and a bold visual style that uses moving camera and long takes. Anderson has been nominated for eleven Academy Awards, three Golden Globe Awards, and eight BAFTA Awards (winning one), and has won a Silver Lion at Venice, a Best Director Award at Cannes, and both a Golden and a Silver Bear at Berlin.

He made his feature-film debut with Hard Eight (1996). He found critical and commercial success with Boogie Nights (1997) and received further accolades with Magnolia (1999) and Punch-Drunk Love (2002), a romantic comedy-drama film. Anderson's fifth film, There Will Be Blood (2007), about an oil prospector during the Southern California oil boom, is often cited as one of the greatest films of the 2000s. This was followed by The Master (2012), Inherent Vice (2014), Phantom Thread (2017), and Licorice Pizza (2021).

Anderson is also known for having directed music videos for artists including Fiona Apple, Radiohead, Haim, Joanna Newsom, Aimee Mann, Jon Brion, and Michael Penn. He directed a documentary, Junun (2015), about the making of the album Junun in India. In 2019, he directed a short music film, Anima, starring Thom Yorke. 

He is noted for his frequent collaborations with actors Melora Walters and John C. Reilly, and the late Philip Baker Hall and Philip Seymour Hoffman; cinematographer Robert Elswit; costume designer Mark Bridges; and composers Jon Brion and Jonny Greenwood.

Early life

Anderson was born in Studio City, Los Angeles, to Edwina (née Gough) and Ernie Anderson. Ernie was an actor who was the voice of ABC and a Cleveland television late-night horror movie host known as "Ghoulardi" (after whom Anderson later named his production company). Anderson grew up in the San Fernando Valley, one of four siblings. He has five half-siblings by his father's first marriage. He had a troubled relationship with his mother, but was close with his father, who encouraged him to become a writer or director. Anderson attended a number of schools, including Buckley, John Thomas Dye School, Campbell Hall School, Cushing Academy, and Montclair Prep.

Anderson was involved in filmmaking from a young age, and never really had an alternative plan to directing films. He made his first film when he was eight, and started making films on a Betamax video camera that his father bought in 1982. He later started using 8 mm film, but realized that video was easier. He began writing in his teen years and experimenting with a Bolex 16-mm camera. After years of experimenting with "standard fare", he wrote and filmed his first real production as a senior in high school at Montclair Prep using money he earned cleaning cages at a pet store. The film was a 30-minute mockumentary shot on video called The Dirk Diggler Story (1988), about a pornography star; the story was inspired by John Holmes, who also served as a major inspiration for Boogie Nights.

Career

Early career
Anderson attended Santa Monica College before enrolling and spending two semesters as an English major at Emerson College where he was taught by David Foster Wallace, and only two days at New York University before he began his career as a production assistant on television, films, music videos, and game shows in Los Angeles and New York City. Feeling that the material shown to him at film school turned the experience into "homework or a chore", Anderson decided to make a 20-minute film that would be his "college".

For $10,000, made up of gambling winnings, his girlfriend's credit card, and money his father set aside for him for college, Anderson made Cigarettes & Coffee (1993), a short film connecting multiple story lines with a $20 bill. The film was screened at the 1993 Sundance Festival Shorts Program. He decided to expand the film to feature-length, and was invited to the 1994 Sundance Feature Film Program. Michael Caton-Jones served as Anderson's mentor. He saw Anderson as someone with "talent and a fully formed creative voice, but not much hands-on experience", and gave him some hard and practical lessons.

1990s
While at the Sundance Feature Film program, Anderson already had a deal with Rysher Entertainment to direct his first full-length feature, Sydney, retitled Hard Eight. After completing the film, Rysher re-edited it. Anderson, who still had the workprint of his original cut, submitted the film to the 1996 Cannes Film Festival, where it was shown at the Un Certain Regard section. Anderson managed to get the version released, but only after he retitled the film, and raised the $200,000 necessary to finish it. Anderson, Philip Baker Hall, John C. Reilly and Gwyneth Paltrow contributed to the final funding. The version that was released was Anderson's and the acclaim from the film launched his career. The film follows a senior gambler, who takes a homeless man under his wing, while he becomes romantically involved with a troubled waitress. It also featured Philip Seymour Hoffman as an arrogant gambler, beginning a five-film collaboration between the pair. In his review of the film, Chicago Sun-Times critic Roger Ebert wrote, "Movies like Hard Eight remind me of what original, compelling characters the movies can sometimes give us."

Anderson worked on the script for his second feature film during his troubles with Hard Eight, and completed it in 1995. The result was his breakout film Boogie Nights, which is based on his short film The Dirk Diggler Story, and is set in the Golden Age of Porn. The film follows a nightclub dishwasher (Mark Wahlberg) who becomes a popular pornographic actor under his stage name. The script was noticed by New Line Cinema's president, Michael De Luca, who felt "totally gaga" reading it. It was released on October 10, 1997, and was a critical and commercial success. The film revived the career of Burt Reynolds, and provided breakout roles for Wahlberg and Julianne Moore. After the film's production, Reynolds refused to star in Anderson's third film, Magnolia. At the 70th Academy Awards, the film was nominated for three awards, including for Best Supporting Actor (Reynolds), Best Supporting Actress (Moore), and Best Original Screenplay.

After the success of Boogie Nights, New Line told Anderson that he could do whatever he wanted for his next film, and granted him creative control. Though Anderson initially wanted to make a film that was "intimate and small-scale", the script "kept blossoming". The resulting film was the ensemble piece Magnolia (1999), which tells the story of the peculiar interaction of several individuals in the San Fernando Valley. Anderson used the music of Aimee Mann as a basis and inspiration for the film, commissioning her to write eight new songs. At the 72nd Academy Awards, the film was nominated for three Academy Awards, including for Best Supporting Actor (Tom Cruise), Best Original Song for "Save Me" by Aimee Mann, and Best Original Screenplay. Anderson stated after the film's release, "what I really feel is that Magnolia is, for better or worse, the best movie I'll ever make."

2000s

After the success of Magnolia, Anderson stated that he would like to work with Adam Sandler in the future, and that he was determined to make his next film a comparatively shorter length of 90 minutes. The resulting feature was the romantic comedy-drama film Punch-Drunk Love (2002), starring Sandler, with Emily Watson portraying his love interest. The story centers on a beleaguered small-business owner with anger issues and seven emasculating sisters. A subplot in the film was partly based on David Phillips (also called the Pudding Guy). Sandler received critical praise for his role in his first major departure from the mainstream comedies that had made him a star. At the 2002 Cannes Film Festival, Anderson won the Best Director Award and was nominated for the Palme d'Or.

There Will Be Blood (2007) was loosely based on Upton Sinclair's novel Oil!. It follows a ruthless silver miner exploiting the Southern California oil boom in the early 20th century. Against a budget of $25 million, the film earned $76.1 million worldwide. There Will Be Blood received eight Academy Award nominations, tying with No Country for Old Men for the most nominations that year. Anderson was nominated for Best Picture, Best Director, and Best Adapted Screenplay, losing all three to the Coen Brothers for No Country for Old Men. Daniel Day-Lewis won the Oscar for Best Actor and Robert Elswit won the prize for Best Cinematography. Paul Dano received a BAFTA nomination for Best Supporting Actor. Anderson was nominated for Best Director from the Directors Guild of America. There Will Be Blood was regarded by some critics as one of the greatest films of the decade, with some parties further declaring it one of the most accomplished American films of the modern era. David Denby of The New Yorker wrote, "the young writer-director Paul Thomas Anderson has now done work that bears comparison to the greatest achievements of Griffith and Ford", while Richard Schickel proclaimed it "one of the most wholly original American movies ever made." In 2017, New York Times film critics A. O. Scott and Manohla Dargis named it the "Best Film of the 21st Century So Far".

2010s—present
In December 2009, Anderson was working on a new project about a "charismatic intellectual" who starts a new religion in the 1950s. An associate of Anderson's stated that the idea for the film had been in Anderson's head for about 12 years. The Master was released on September 14, 2012 in North America to critical acclaim. The film follows an alcoholic World War II veteran, who meets the leader of a religious movement known as "The Cause". Though the film makes no reference to the movement, it has "long been widely assumed to be based on Scientology." The film received three nominations at the 85th Academy Awards, including for Joaquin Phoenix for Best Leading Actor, Philip Seymour Hoffman for Best Supporting Actor, and Amy Adams for Best Supporting Actress.

Production of the film adaptation for Thomas Pynchon's 2009 novel Inherent Vice began in May and ended in August 2013. The film marked the first time that Pynchon allowed his work to be adapted for the screen, and had Anderson work with Phoenix for a second time. The supporting cast includes Owen Wilson, Reese Witherspoon, Jena Malone, Martin Short, Benicio Del Toro, Katherine Waterston, and Josh Brolin. Following its release in December 2014, the film received two nominations at the 87th Academy Awards, including for Best Adapted Screenplay and Best Costume Design.

Anderson directed Junun, a 2015 documentary about the making of the album by composer and Radiohead guitarist Jonny Greenwood, Radiohead producer Nigel Godrich, Israeli composer Shye Ben Tzur, and a group of Indian musicians. Most of the performances were recorded at the 15th-century Mehrangarh Fort in Rajasthan. Junun premiered at the 2015 New York Film Festival.

Anderson's eighth feature film, Phantom Thread, set in the London fashion industry in 1954, was released in 2017. Day-Lewis starred in his final film role to date, after starring in his penultimate film Lincoln. The cast also includes Lesley Manville, Vicky Krieps and Richard Graham. Focus Features distributed the film in the United States, with Universal handling international distribution. Principal photography began in January 2017. Elswit was absent during production, and despite claims of Anderson acting as a cinematographer on the film, no official credit was given. On February 16, 2019, Elswit said he would not work with Anderson on his next films. Phantom Thread received six nominations at the 90th Academy Awards, winning one for Best Costume Design.

In 2019, Anderson directed the short music film Anima, starring the Radiohead singer Thom Yorke and featuring music from Yorke's album Anima. It was screened in select IMAX theatres on June 26 and released on Netflix on June 27. It was nominated for Best Music Film at the 2020 Grammy Awards. Anderson's ninth feature film, Licorice Pizza, received a wide release on December 25, 2021. Licorice Pizza received three Academy Award nominations, including Best Picture and Best Director. The film takes place in the 1970s and is about a teenage actor.

Other work
In 2000, Anderson wrote and directed a segment for Saturday Night Live with Ben Affleck, "SNL FANatic", based on the MTV series FANatic. He was a standby director during the 2005 filming of Robert Altman's A Prairie Home Companion for insurance purposes, as Altman was 80 years old at the time. In 2008, Anderson co-wrote and directed a 70-minute play at the Largo Theatre, comprising a series of vignettes starring Maya Rudolph and Fred Armisen, with a live score by Jon Brion.

Anderson has directed music videos for artists including Fiona Apple, Radiohead, Haim, Joanna Newsom, Aimee Mann, Jon Brion, and Michael Penn. Anderson directed a short film for Haim in 2017, Valentine, featuring three musical performances from the band.

Influences and style

Influences
Anderson attended film school for only two days, preferring instead to learn by watching the films of directors he liked along with the accompanying director's audio commentary. He has cited Stanley Kubrick, Robert Altman, Jonathan Demme, Martin Scorsese, Orson Welles, Alfred Hitchcock, Max Ophüls, John Huston, Anthony Mann, David Mamet, Francois Truffaut, Vincente Minnelli, Akira Kurosawa, Steven Spielberg, Billy Wilder, Mike Leigh, Frank Tashlin, and Robert Downey, Sr. as influences.

Themes and style
Anderson is known for films set in San Fernando Valley with realistically flawed and desperate characters. Among the themes dealt with in Anderson's films are dysfunctional familial relationships, alienation, surrogate families, regret, loneliness, destiny, the power of forgiveness, and ghosts of the past. Anderson makes frequent use of repetition to build emphasis and thematic consistency. In Boogie Nights, Magnolia, Punch Drunk Love and The Master, the phrase "I didn't do anything" is used at least once, developing themes of responsibility and denial. Anderson's films are known for their bold visual style which includes stylistic trademarks such as constantly moving camera, steadicam-based long takes, memorable use of music, and multilayered audiovisual imagery. Anderson tends to reference the Book of Exodus, either explicitly or subtly, such as in recurring references to Exodus 8:2 in Magnolia, which chronicles the plague of frogs, culminating with the literal raining of frogs in the film's climax, or the title and themes in There Will Be Blood, a phrase in Exodus 7:19, which details the plague of blood.

Within his first three films, Hard Eight, Boogie Nights, and Magnolia, Anderson explored themes of dysfunctional families, alienation, and loneliness. Boogie Nights and Magnolia were noted for their large ensemble casts, which Anderson returned to in Inherent Vice. In Punch-Drunk Love, Anderson explored similar themes, but expressed a different visual style, shedding the influences and references of his earlier films, being more surreal and having a heightened sense of reality. It was also short, compared to his previous two films, at 90 minutes.

There Will Be Blood stood apart from his first four films, but shared similar themes and style such as flawed characters, moving camera, memorable music, and a lengthy running time. The film was more overtly engaged with politics than his previous films had been, examining capitalism and themes such as savagery, optimism, and obsession. The Master dealt with "ideas about American personality, success, rootlessness, master-disciple dynamics, and father-son mutually assured destruction." All of his films deal with American themes, with business versus art in Boogie Nights, ambition in There Will Be Blood, and self-reinvention in The Master.

Frequent collaborators

Anderson frequently collaborates with many actors and crew, carrying them over on each film. He has referred to regular actors as "my little rep company", including John C. Reilly, Philip Baker Hall, Julianne Moore, William H. Macy, Melora Walters and, most prominently, the late Philip Seymour Hoffman. Luis Guzmán is also considered Anderson's regular. Hoffman acted in Anderson's first four films as well as The Master. Except for Paul F. Tompkins, Kevin Breznahan and Jim Meskimen, who all had equally minor roles in Magnolia, There Will Be Blood had an entirely new cast. Anderson is one of three directors – the others being Jim Sheridan and Martin Scorsese – with whom Daniel Day-Lewis has collaborated more than once. Robert Elswit served as a cinematographer for Anderson's films, except The Master which was shot by Mihai Mălaimare Jr. and Phantom Thread which has no credited cinematographer. Jon Brion served as a composer for Hard Eight, Magnolia and Punch-Drunk Love, and Jonny Greenwood of Radiohead for every film since. Dylan Tichenor edited Boogie Nights, Magnolia, There Will Be Blood and Phantom Thread. Anderson regularly works with producers, JoAnne Sellar, Scott Rudin, Michael De Luca and Daniel Lupi, and casting director Cassandra Kulukundis.

Filmography

Personal life
Anderson dated musician Fiona Apple from 1997 to 2000. Apple said he had a temper and once threw a chair across the room and shoved her out of his car, and that he made her "fearful and numb".

Anderson is a vegan.

Anderson has been in a relationship with actress and comedian Maya Rudolph since November 2001. They live in the San Fernando Valley with their four children.

Awards and recognition

Anderson has been called "one of the most exciting talents to come along in years" and "among the supreme talents of today." After the release of Boogie Nights and Magnolia, Anderson was praised as a "wunderkind". In 2007, the American Film Institute regarded him as "one of American film's modern masters." In 2012, The Guardian ranked him number one on its list of "The 23 Best Film Directors in the World," writing "his dedication to his craft has intensified, with his disdain for PR and celebrity marking him out as the most devout filmmaker of his generation." In 2013, Entertainment Weekly named him the eighth-greatest working director, calling him "one of the most dynamic directors to emerge in the last 20 years." Peter Travers of Rolling Stone wrote that "The Master, the sixth film from the 42-year-old writer-director, affirms his position as the foremost filmmaking talent of his generation. Anderson is a rock star, the artist who knows no limits."

Other directors have also praised him. In an interview with Jan Aghed, Ingmar Bergman referenced Magnolia as an example of the strength of American cinema. Sam Mendes referred to Anderson as "a true auteur – and there are very few of those who I would classify as geniuses". In his acceptance speech for the Golden Globe Award for Best Director, Ben Affleck compared Anderson to Orson Welles.

, Anderson is the only person to win all three director prizes from the three major international film festivals (Cannes, Berlin, Venice).

Direction for Oscar-related performances

References

External links

 
 Cigarettes & Red Vines - The Definitive Paul Thomas Anderson Resource
 Esquire magazine profile

1970 births
Living people
20th-century American male writers
20th-century American screenwriters
21st-century American male writers
21st-century American screenwriters
American film producers
American male screenwriters
American music video directors
Cannes Film Festival Award for Best Director winners
Directors of Golden Bear winners
Film directors from Los Angeles
Film producers from California
People from the San Fernando Valley
People from Studio City, Los Angeles
Postmodernist filmmakers
Screenwriters from California
Silver Bear for Best Director recipients
Venice Best Director Silver Lion winners
Montclair College Preparatory School alumni